The Manoogian Mansion is the official residence of the Mayor of Detroit, Michigan. It is located at 9240 Dwight Street in the Berry Subdivision Historic District, on the city's east side, backing up to the Detroit River.

History
The mansion was built in 1928 at the cost of $300,000 ($ million in ). The original owner lost the home during the Great Depression and it sat vacant until Alex Manoogian, founder of the Masco company, purchased the home at an auction in 1939 for a mere $25,000 ($ million in ). In 1966, Manoogian donated the mansion to the City of Detroit. Jerry Cavanagh and his family became the first mayoral family to occupy the mansion

In late 2002 rumors began surfacing that Mayor Kwame Kilpatrick had thrown an excessive party there. After defeating Kenneth Cockrel, Jr. in a special election in 2009 following Kilpatrick's resignation, new mayor Dave Bing did not immediately move into the mansion because of city budget issues. Cockrel likewise had not moved into the mansion. Bing moved into the mansion in 2010. He considered altering the mansion's name to remove association with the rumored Kilpatrick partying incident.

Location and composition
The  Manoogian Mansion is located along the Detroit River, several miles east of Downtown Detroit. The Associated Press stated that it is in "a small, older subdivision". As of 2010 the maintenance cost was $116,000 per year.

Architecture
The Manoogian Mansion has Mediterranean Revival-Spanish Colonial Revival Style architecture with a Mission Revival Style influence including a terra-cotta tile roof. The physical layout of the house is dominated by walls of windows – bowed windows, arched windows, leaded windows – that let light stream in and open onto views of the grounds and the Detroit River. The downstairs contains three sunrooms facing south and the river. There are 15 rooms in all, including a large living room, library, kitchen and two dining rooms: a formal room and a more casual one that looks toward the river. It has four bedrooms, plus two small bedrooms for servants. There are three full baths, a servants' bath and two half-baths. The Berry Historic Subdivision Historic District has the former homes of several prominent Detroit residents, including John and Frederic Ford, Arthur Clamage, and John Kay of Wright-Kay Jewelers. Notable architects who designed for the subdivision included John M. Donaldson and Henry J. Meier, A. C. Varney, Roland Geis and Robert O. Derrick.
The Manoogian mansion is one of the few houses in Detroit that has a boat house.

See also

Manoogian Mansion party and the murder of Tamara Greene

Notes

External links

Armenian-American culture in Michigan
Mayors' mansions in the United States
Houses in Detroit
Spanish Colonial Revival architecture in the United States
Mediterranean Revival architecture in the United States
Local government buildings in the United States
Houses completed in 1928